Howard Sings Ashman is a two-disc album compiled by PS Classics as part of their Songwriter Series. The album features Howard Ashman singing selections from his musicals, including God Bless You, Mr. Rosewater (1979), Little Shop of Horrors (1982), Smile (1986), The Little Mermaid (1989), Beauty and the Beast (1991) and Aladdin (1992).

Production 
The album is produced with the assistance and cooperation of Howard's sister Sarah Ashman Gillespie, and his life partner William Lauch.  According to PS Classics website, the album "captures the diverse and memorable accomplishments of one of the geniuses of the contemporary American musical theatre."

The album consists of private demo recordings of Howard Ashman. The first disc has 18 tracks which feature Howard's works with Alan Menken, including hits from shows Little Shop of Horrors, The Little Mermaid and Beauty and the Beast, deleted songs from Aladdin, songs from lesser known musical called God Bless You, Mr. Rosewater, individual tracks from Diamonds (with Jonathan Sheffer) and a song from the unfinished musical Babe.

The second disc, a bonus CD, features 15 complete demo tracks from Ashman's collaboration with Marvin Hamlisch, the  musical Smile, with Ashman and Hamlisch singing the songs. Smile was a short-lived musical about a teen beauty pageant and did not have a cast album. William Ruhlmann, in his review on AllMusic wrote of Smile: "...the score comes off as witty and appealing, even with two adult men portraying a bunch of teenage girls."

Track listing

Disc one

Disc two

*"Bad" is an unused song for the 1986 movie, Little Shop Of Horrors. It was replaced by "Mean Green Mother from Outer Space". The song did not make it past the demo stage, but the sequence was storyboarded for the film

References 

2008 compilation albums
Howard Ashman albums